Monozukuri, or alternatively spelled Monodzukuri, literally means 'production' or 'making of things' in Japanese and is the Japanese term for 'manufacturing'. The broader meaning encompasses a synthesis of technological prowess, know-how and spirit of Japan's manufacturing practices. The spirit includes a sincere attitude towards production with pride, skill and dedication and the pursuit of innovation and perfection. It is currently a buzzword in Japan and many Japanese people believe that monozukuri has led Japan to a dominant position in the world market.

Overview 
The Japanese word  is a combination of 'mono' meaning thing and 'zukuri' meaning the act of making. It simply means craftsmanship or manufacturing and has come to be used as a buzzword in industry and mass media to embody the Japanese spirit and history of manufacturing. It is a word of Japanese origin and has only recently, since the latter half of the 1990s, come to mean manufacturing and production. Its usage was popularized after the promulgation of the Basic Act on the Promotion of Core Manufacturing Technology on March 19, 1999.

Basic Act on the Promotion of Core Manufacturing Technology

The Basic Act on the Promotion of Core Manufacturing Technology Act No. 2 was established on March 19, 1999, to support the development of the manufacturing industry. Due to changes in employment structure, industrialization overseas, and changes in the economy, the share of the manufacturing industry in Japan's GDP fell in the 1990s.

The English translation of Article 9:

See also 
 Just-in-time manufacturing
 Toyota Production System
 Lean manufacturing
 Kaizen (continuous improvement)

Notes

References 

Manufacturing
1990s neologisms